Bibaringa is a northern suburb of Adelaide, South Australia in the City of Playford. It straddles the Gawler–One Tree Hill Road which follows the ridge up from Gawler between the South Para River gorge on the east of Bibaringa and the Adelaide Plains on the west.

References

Suburbs of Adelaide